Ancash Quechua, or Huaylay (Waylay), is a Quechua variety spoken in the Peruvian department of Ancash by approximately 1,000,000 people. Like Wanka Quechua, it belongs to Quechua I (according to Alfredo Torero).

Classification 
The Ancash Quechua varieties belong to the Quechua I branch of the homonymous language family, belonging to a dialectal continuum extended in the central Peruvian Sierra from Ancash in the north to the provinces of Castrovirreyna and Yauyos in the south.

Some varieties bordering this continuum partially share morphological characteristics that distinguish the Ancash group from the other central Quechua, so it is difficult to establish a discrete limit. Among these nearby varieties are the Quechua of Bolognesi, Ocros and Cajatambo and that of the Alto Marañón region in the department of Huánuco.

See also 
 Quechuan and Aymaran spelling shift

References

External links

(In Anchash Quechua) KAYMI KAN LLAPAN MUNDUCHAW IMANAW KAQ RUNAKUNAPAPIS DIRICHUNKUNA (Universal Declaration of Human Rights)
 Crossing aspectual frontiers South Conchucos Quechua.
 Lustig, Wolf (1996): Glossary Quechua Ancashino 

Languages of Peru
Quechuan languages
Indigenous languages of the Andes